Cranberry Township is the name of four townships in the United States:
Cranberry Township, Butler County, Pennsylvania
Cranberry, Venango County, Pennsylvania
Cranberry Township, Alleghany County, North Carolina
Cranberry Township, Avery County, North Carolina
Cranberry Township, Crawford County, Ohio

Township name disambiguation pages